Sushi Ginza Onodera is a Michelin Guide-starred restaurant in West Hollywood, California.

See also 

 List of Japanese restaurants
 List of Michelin starred restaurants in Los Angeles and Southern California

References

External links
 

Asian restaurants in Los Angeles
Japanese restaurants in California
Michelin Guide starred restaurants in California